Karamat Huseynov (born 30 August 1998) is an Azerbaijani judoka, who competes in the −60 kg division. Member of the Azerbaijani national judo team, bronze medalist of the 2021 World Championship and the 2021 European Championship.

In 2021, he won one of the bronze medals in the men's 60 kg event at the 2021 European Judo Championships held in Lisbon, Portugal.

Biography 
Karamat Huseynov was born on August 30, 1998 in Baku.  Seeing the 9-year-old Karamat's interest in judo, his uncle (sister's brother) Olympic champion judoist Elnur Mammadli advised in 2007 to enroll the boy in this sport.  Thus, Karamat Huseynov became a member of the Attila sports club.  His first coach was Emin Fatullaev, under whom Karamat Huseynov subsequently trained.

Career 
In 2008, Karamat Huseynov becomes the champion of Baku among youths, and already at the age of 16 he wins the championship of Azerbaijan.  In 2014, he wins a gold medal at the European Youth Cup in the Portuguese city of Coimbra, and takes bronze at a similar tournament in Bielsko-Biala, Poland.

Karamat Huseynov won a silver medal at the 2015 European Youth Olympic Festival in Tbilisi.  In 2017, he won a silver medal at the World Junior Championships in Zagreb.  In the same year, Huseynov became the European champion among juniors in 2017 in Maribor and the bronze medalist of the European Championship among judokas under 23 in Podgorica.

In 2018 in Saarbrücken Karamat Huseynov won a bronze medal.  In 2018, he won the silver medal at the European Cup in Orenburg.  At the 2018 World Championships in Baku, Huseynov took fifth place in the weight category up to 60 kg.  Here he sensationally defeated the reigning Olympic champion Beslan Mudranov, but lost to future world champion Naohisa Takato from Japan in the quarterfinals.  In the fight for bronze he lost to Amiran Papinashvili from Georgia.

At the Grand Slam tournament in Tbilisi in 2021, Huseynov won a bronze medal.  In the same year, Huseynov won a bronze medal at the European Championships in Lisbon.  In June 2021, at the World Championships, which took place in the capital of Hungary, in Budapest, an Azerbaijani athlete won a bronze medal in the up to 60 kg weight category, defeating Magzhan Shamshadin, an athlete from Kazakhstan, in a fight for 3rd place.

References

External links

 
 
 

1998 births
Living people
Azerbaijani male judoka
Judoka at the 2019 European Games
European Games competitors for Azerbaijan
Judoka at the 2020 Summer Olympics
Olympic judoka of Azerbaijan
21st-century Azerbaijani people